Pravara Kanya Vidya Mandir is a school at Loni in the Ahmednagar district of Maharashtra, India.

It has achieved the distinction of being  one of the largest  residential high schools for girls in rural Maharashtra. More  than 2000  girls  from all over  the state are studying here. The school is  ISO 9001:2008  certified  and  recipient  of the  Best School Award of the District under Mahatma  Phule  Educational Quality Development Programme.

History 
Pravara Kanya Vidya Mandir was established  in 1969 and is now one of the largest residential high schools for girls in rural Maharashtra. More than 2000  girls study there, from pre-primary to higher secondary level and also in vocational courses.

Academics 

 Primary Section
 Class 1 to 4
 Secondary Section
 Class 5 to 10
 Higher Secondary Section
 Science      Class 11 and 12
 Home Science Class 11 and 12
 Vocational Education
 Electronics Technology  Class 11 and 12
 Medical Lab Technician  Class 11 and 12

Social Initiatives 
The Gangubai Vikhe Patil Trust offers  economic  assistance to the poor and needy girl students. For the  drop-out students the 	school  offers the  vocational courses  like  Beauty Therapy and  Garment-making  which are affiliated to City & Guilds, London to help them in self-employment.

References

External links 
 Official Website Pravara Kanya Vidya Mandir 
 Subroto Football Cup 2012 Subroto Cup: Kalyangarh Bidyamandir in final
 Article in Times of India

Girls' schools in Maharashtra
Schools in Maharashtra
Education in Ahmednagar district
Educational institutions established in 1969
1969 establishments in Maharashtra